The 2016–17 Washington Huskies women's basketball team represented University of Washington during the 2016–17 NCAA Division I women's basketball season. The Huskies, led by fourth year head coach Mike Neighbors, played their home games at Alaska Airlines Arena and were members of the Pac-12 Conference. In the final regular season game for the Huskies on February 25, 2017, Kelsey Plum scored a Pac-12 record 57 points in an 84–77 win over Utah to set NCAA Division I women's basketball career scoring record. They finished the season 29–6, 15–3 in Pac-12 play to finish in a tie for second place. They were upset by the 10 seed Oregon in the quarterfinals of Pac-12 women's tournament. They received an at-large bid of the NCAA women's tournament where they defeated Montana State and Oklahoma in the first and second rounds before losing to Mississippi State in the sweet sixteen. With 29 wins in the regular season, the most wins in school history.

On April 3, Mike Neighbors resigned from Washington to accept the head coaching job at Arkansas. He finished with a four-year record of 98–41.

Roster

Schedule

|-
!colspan=9 style="background:#363c74; color:#e8d3a2;" | Exhibition

|-
!colspan=12 style="background:#363c74; color:#e8d3a2;"| Non-conference regular season

|-
!colspan=12 style="background:#363c74; color:#e8d3a2;"| Pac-12 regular season

|-
!colspan=9 style="background:#363c74;" | Pac-12 Women's Tournament

|-
!colspan=9 style="background:#363c74;" | NCAA Women's Tournament

Rankings
2016–17 NCAA Division I women's basketball rankings

See also
2016–17 Washington Huskies men's basketball team

References

Washington Huskies women's basketball seasons
Washington
Washington
Washington
Washington
Washington